Biathlon at the 2013 Winter Universiade was held at the Stadio del Fondo di Lago di Tesero in Tesero from December 13 to December 20, 2013.

Men's events 

 Russian Aleksandr Pechenkin, who finished first in pursuit, was later was disqualified by the IBU because of an anti-doping rule violation. However, there were no decision on medal reallocation regarding the results of the Universiade.

Women's events

Mixed events 

 Though Aleksandr Pechenkin was later disqualified by the IBU because of an anti-doping rule violation, there were no decision on the medal reallocation.

Medal table

References

External links
Official results at the universiadetrentino.org.

2013 in biathlon
Alpine skiing
2013